Handball has been a Central American and Caribbean Games event since 1993 in Ponce, Puerto Rico. In addition to crowning the handball champions of the Central American and Caribbean Games, the tournament also serves as a qualifying tournament for the Pan American Games.

Men

Summary

Medal table

Participating nations

Women

Summary

Medal table

Participating nations

References
 www.panamhandball.org

 
Central American and Caribbean Games
Handball
Central American and Caribbean Games
Central American and Caribbean Games